The 1930 Maine gubernatorial election took place on September 8, 1930. Incumbent Republican Governor William Tudor Gardiner defeated Democratic candidate Edward C. Moran Jr.

Results

References

Gubernatorial
1930
Maine
September 1930 events